Marco Negri (born 24 May 1955) is a retired Italian volleyball player. He was part of Italian teams that finished eighth at the 1976 Summer Olympics, second at the 1978 World Championships and third at the 1984 Summer Olympics.

References

1955 births
Living people
Italian men's volleyball players
Olympic volleyball players of Italy
Volleyball players at the 1976 Summer Olympics
Volleyball players at the 1984 Summer Olympics
Olympic bronze medalists for Italy
Sportspeople from Mantua
Olympic medalists in volleyball
Medalists at the 1984 Summer Olympics